The crested malimbe (Malimbus malimbicus) is a species of bird in the family Ploceidae.
It is found in Angola, Cameroon, Central African Republic, Republic of the Congo, Democratic Republic of the Congo, Ivory Coast, Equatorial Guinea, Gabon, Ghana, Guinea, Liberia, Mali, Nigeria, Sierra Leone, Togo, and Uganda.
Its natural habitat is subtropical or tropical moist lowland forests.

References

External links
 Crested malimbe -  Species text in Weaver Watch.

crested malimbe
Birds of Sub-Saharan Africa
crested malimbe
Taxonomy articles created by Polbot